San Juan Bautista ("St. John the Baptist") was one of Japan's first Japanese-built Western-style sailing ships. She crossed the Pacific in 1614. She was of the Spanish galleon type, known in Japan as nanban-sen (南蛮船, "Southern Barbarian ships").

She transported a Japanese diplomatic mission of 180 people during the first leg of their trip to the Vatican as envoys to Pope Paul V, headed by Hasekura Tsunenaga and accompanied by the Spanish friar Luis Sotelo. After transporting Hasekura to Acapulco in the Spanish possession of New Spain, the ship returned to Japan. Hasekura and the embassy went on to Europe, eventually reaching Rome.

Construction
San Juan Bautista was built in 1613 by Date Masamune, the daimyō of Sendai in northern Japan, in Tsuki-No-Ura harbour (Ishinomaki, Miyagi Prefecture). The project had been approved by the Bakufu, the shōguns government in Edo.

The shōgun already had two smaller ships (80 and 120 tons) built for him by the English pilot William Adams. The larger, the San Buena Ventura, was given to Spanish shipwrecked sailors to return to New Spain in 1610. The shōgun also issued numerous permits for Red seal ships, destined for Asian trade and incorporating many elements of Western ship design.

San Juan Bautista is reported to have required 45 days' work, with the participation of technical experts from the Bakufu, 800  shipwrights, 700 smiths, and 3000 carpenters. Two Spanish men also participated to the endeavour: the friar Luis Sotelo, and the Spanish captain Sebastián Vizcaíno.

These efforts were seen with disapproval by the Spanish government in Manila, and Los Rios Coronel suggested that Luis Sotelo should not be allowed into Japan any further (C. R. Boxer).

Two trans-Pacific round-trips
 

Upon completion, the ship left on October 28, 1613, for Acapulco in New Spain, with around 180 people on board, consisting of 10 samurai of the shōgun (led by the Minister of the Navy Mukai Shōgen Tadakatsu), 12 samurai from Sendai, 120 Japanese merchants, sailors, and servants, and around 40 Spaniards and Portuguese. The ship arrived in Acapulco on January 25, 1614, after three months at sea.

After a year in Acapulco, the ship returned to Japan on April 28, 1615, as Hasekura continued to Europe. It seems that around 50 specialists in mining and silver-refining were invited to Japan on this occasion, so that they could help develop the mining industry in the Sendai area. A group of Franciscans led by Father Diego de Santa Catalina, sent as a religious embassy to Tokugawa Ieyasu also sailed on the ship. The San Juan Bautista arrived in Uraga, Japan  on August 15, 1615.

In September 1616 the San Juan Batista headed again to Acapulco, at the request of Luis Sotelo. She was sailed by Captain Yokozawa Shōgen, but the trip went wrong and around 100 sailors died en route. San Juan Bautista finally arrived in Acapulco in May 1617. Sotelo and Hasekura met in Mexico for the return trip back to Japan. In April 1618 the ship arrived in the Philippines, where she was sold to the Spanish government there with the objective of building up defenses against the Dutch. Hasekura returned to Japan in 1620.

During his absence Japan had changed quite drastically: Christianity was being eradicated, and Japan was moving towards a period of seclusion. Because of these persecutions, the trade agreements with New Spain he had been trying to establish were also denied. In the end, his efforts seem to have had few results, and he died two years later of illness.

1993 Replica ship

A new San Juan Bautista was reconstructed in 1993 on the basis of the records of the House of Date. Although its blueprints have not been found, the ship's dimensions were recorded properly, permitting a speculative reconstitution. The ship is currently on display in a theme park in Ishinomaki, in northern Japan, close to the location where she was originally built. The replica survived the 2011 Tōhoku earthquake and tsunami with some damage, and there were hopes in 2011 of using the ship as a symbol of the town's reconstruction.

In November 2013 the repaired San Juan Bautista was rededicated. Assistance had come from a British Columbia lumber company who supplied the massive logs to create masts that had been damaged in the tsunami. However, the replica ship was deemed to be unsafe to the public due to structural damage from floodwater and other factors, and the Ishinomaki prefectural government decided to demolish the ship rather than to continue repairing it. Dismantling began in November 2021. The government plans to build a new ship in its place, using reinforced plastic and reducing the size to one quarter of the original.

See also

Manila galleon
List of ships of the Imperial Japanese Navy
Red seal ships
Ship replica (including a list of ship replicas)

References

Notes

Bibliography 
The Christian century in Japan 1549–1650 C. R. Boxer 
Quand le Japon s'ouvrit au monde Francis Marcouin and Keiko Omoto

External links
Reconstitution of the San Juan Bautista
Ship plan
Ship interior
Ship guns
Various views of the ship

Replica ships
Ships of the Tokugawa Navy
Galleons
1610s ships
Ships built in Japan